Mikhail Datoyevich Tsulaya (born 8 February 2005) is a Russian footballer who plays as a goalkeeper for FC Rostov.

Club career
Tsulaya made his debut for FC Rostov on 23 November 2022 in a Russian Cup game against FC Orenburg.

Career statistics

References

External links
 
 
 
 

Living people
2005 births
Russian people of Georgian descent
Sportspeople from Rostov-on-Don
Russian footballers
Association football goalkeepers
Russia youth international footballers
FC Rostov players